Andrej Kmec (born July 24, 1977) is a Slovak former professional ice hockey right winger.

Kmec played a total of 486 regular season games in the Tipsport Liga over sixteen seasons, playing for HK Nitra, HK Dukla Trenčín and HC Slovan Bratislava.

References

External links

1977 births
Living people
Bisons de Neuilly-sur-Marne players
HK Dubnica players
HK Dukla Michalovce players
HK Dukla Trenčín players
HK Nitra players
Slovak ice hockey right wingers
HC Slovan Bratislava players
Sportspeople from Nitra
HK Trnava players
Expatriate ice hockey players in France
Slovak expatriate ice hockey people
Slovak expatriate sportspeople in France